Chisocheton ceramicus is a tree in the family Meliaceae. The bark is dark brown. The fragrant flowers are pinkish. The tree is named for Seram Island in Indonesia's Maluku. Habitat is forests from sea level to  altitude. C. ceramicus is found in Thailand, Vietnam, throughout Malesia and New Britain.

References

ceramicus
Plants described in 1868
Trees of Thailand
Trees of Vietnam
Trees of Malesia
Trees of Papuasia
Taxa named by Friedrich Anton Wilhelm Miquel